Valerianus Magnus or Valeriano Magni (October 11, 1586 – July 20, 1661) was an Italian Capuchin, missionary preacher in Central Europe, philosopher, polemicist and author.

Biography
He was born at Milan, presumably of the noble family of de Magni. He received the Capuchin habit at Prague. He was also provincial superior there, as in 1626 was appointed Apostolic missionary for Germany, Hungary and Poland. He was greatly respected by Holy Roman Emperors Ferdinand II and Ferdinand III, as well as by King Władysław IV Vasa, who employed him on diplomatic missions. In July 1647 he performed a vacuum experiment (so-called Torricelli's experiment) before a distinguished audience at the Royal Castle in Warsaw. The conversion of the Calvinist theologian Bartholomaeus Nigrinus, who was appointed confidential secretary to Władysław IV, was certainly a result of his influence, and it strengthened the Catholic party in Poland.

Landgrave Ernst of Hesse, who had been converted at Vienna on 6 January 1652, and who knew Father Valerianus, summoned Capuchins to St. Goar on the Rhine, and was present at the religious disputation between Valerianus and Peter Haberkorn of Giessen at Burg Rheinfels in 1651. The Jesuit Johann Rosenthal having attacked certain assertions of Valerianus' at this debate, the latter was drawn into the sharp literary controversy between Capuchins and Jesuits, which extended even to Rome. On the appearance of his pamphlet Contra imposturas Jesuitarum in 1659, he was cited to appear at Rome. As he did not obey the summons he was arrested at Vienna in 1661 at the instance of the nuncio, but was liberated at the urgent request of Ferdinand III.

He was apparently on his way to Rome when in the same year death overtook him at Salzburg.

Selected works

 Judicium de catholicorum et acatholicorum regula credendi, 1628, 1641.
 De luce mentium, 1642.
 Organum theologicum, 1643.
 Methodus convincendi et revocandi haereticos, 1643.
 Echo Absurditatum Ulrici de Neufeld Blesa, 1646.
 Demonstratio ocularis, loci sine locato: corporis successiue moti in vacuo..., 1648
 
 Principia et specimen philosophiae, 1652.
 Acta disputationis habitae Rheinfelsae apud S. Goarem, 1652.
 Epistola de quaestione utrum Primatus Rom. Pontificis ..., 1653.
 Commentarius de homine infami personato sub titulis Iocosi Severi Medii, 1654.
 Concussio fundamentorum ecclesiae catholicae, iactata ab Herm. Conringi ..., 1654.
 Conringiana concussio Sanctissimi in Christo papae catholici retorta ..., 1654.
 Epistola ... de responsione H. Conringii, 1654.
 Epistola Valeriani Magni Fratris Capucini ..., 1654.
 Opus philosophicum, 1660
 Apologia contra imposturas Jesuitarum, 1661.
 Christiana et catholica defensio adversus Societatem Jesu, 1661.

Notes

Sources

External links
 

Magni, Valeriano
Magni, Valeriano
Magni, Valeriano
Magni, Valeriano
Capuchins
Nobility from Milan
Italian diplomats
17th-century Italian philosophers
17th-century Italian scientists
17th-century Italian Roman Catholic theologians